Anne Brontë (commonly ; 17 January 1820 – 28 May 1849) was an English novelist and poet, and the youngest member of the Brontë literary family.

Anne Brontë was the daughter of Maria (born Branwell) and Patrick Brontë, a poor Irish clergyman in the Church of England. Anne lived most of her life with her family at the parish of Haworth on the Yorkshire moors. Otherwise, she attended a boarding school in Mirfield between 1836 and 1837, and between 1839 and 1845 lived elsewhere working as a governess. In 1846  she published a book of poems with her sisters and later two novels, initially under the pen name Acton Bell. Her first novel, Agnes Grey, was published in 1847 with Wuthering Heights. Her second novel, The Tenant of Wildfell Hall, was published in 1848. The Tenant of Wildfell Hall is often considered one of the first feminist novels.

Anne died at 29, most likely of pulmonary tuberculosis. After her death, her sister Charlotte edited Agnes Grey to fix issues with its first edition, but prevented republication of The Tenant of Wildfell Hall. As a result, Anne is not as well known as her sisters. Nonetheless, both of her novels are considered classics of English literature.

Family background

Anne's father was Patrick Brontë (1777–1861). Patrick Brontë was born in a two-room cottage in Emdale, Loughbrickland, County Down, Ireland. He was the oldest of ten children born to Hugh Brunty and Eleanor McCrory, poor Irish peasant farmers. The family surname, mac Aedh Ó Proinntigh, was Anglicised as Prunty or Brunty. Struggling against poverty, Patrick learned to read and write, and from 1798 taught others. In 1802, at 25, he won a place to study theology at St. John's College, Cambridge. Here he changed his name, Brunty, to the more distinguished sounding Brontë. In 1807, he was ordained in the priesthood in the Church of England. He served as a curate in Essex and then in Wellington, Shropshire. In 1810, he published his first poem, Winter Evening Thoughts, in a local newspaper. In 1811, he published a collection of moral verse, Cottage Poems. Also in 1811, he became vicar of St. Peter's Church in Hartshead, Yorkshire. In 1812, he was appointed an examiner in Classics at Woodhouse Grove School, near Bradford. This was a Wesleyan academy where, at 35, he met his future wife, the headmaster's niece, Maria Branwell.

Maria Branwell (1783–1821), Anne's mother, was the daughter of Anne Carne, the daughter of a silversmith, and Thomas Branwell, a successful and property-owning grocer and tea merchant in Penzance. Maria was the eleventh of twelve children and enjoyed the benefits of a prosperous family in a small town. After the death of her parents, Maria went to help her aunt with housekeeping functions at the school. Maria was intelligent and well read, and her strong Methodist faith attracted Patrick Brontë, whose own leanings were similar.

Within three months, on 29 December 1812, though from considerably different backgrounds, Patrick Brontë and Maria Branwell were married. Their first child, Maria (1814–1825), was born after they moved to Hartshead. In 1815, Patrick was appointed curate of the chapel in Market Street Thornton, near Bradford. A second daughter, Elizabeth (1815–1825), was born shortly after. Four more children followed: Charlotte (1816–1855), Patrick Branwell (1817–1848), Emily (1818–1848), and Anne (1820–1849).

Early life
Anne was the youngest of the Brontë children. She was born on 17 January 1820 on the outskirts of Bradford. Her father, Patrick, was curate there. Anne was baptised there on 25 March 1820. In April 1820 the family moved into the five-roomed Haworth Parsonage.

When Anne was barely a year old her mother, Maria, became ill, probably with uterine cancer. Maria Branwell died on 15 September 1821. Patrick tried to remarry, without success. Maria's sister, Elizabeth Branwell (1776–1842), had moved to the parsonage initially for Maria, but spent the rest of her life there raising Maria's children. She did it from a sense of duty. She was stern and expected respect, not love. There was little affection between her and the older children. According to tradition Anne was her favourite.

In Elizabeth Gaskell's biography of Charlotte, Patrick remembered Anne as precocious. Patrick said that when Anne was four years old he had asked her what a child most wanted and that she had said: "age and experience".

In summer 1824 Patrick sent daughters Maria, Elizabeth, Charlotte, and Emily to Crofton Hall in Crofton, West Yorkshire, and subsequently to the Clergy Daughter's School at Cowan Bridge in Lancashire. Maria and Elizabeth Brontë died of consumption on 6 May and 15 June 1825 respectively, and Charlotte and Emily were brought home. The unexpected deaths distressed the family so much that Patrick could not face sending them away again. They were educated at home for the next five years, largely by Elizabeth Branwell and Patrick. The children made little attempt to mix with others outside the parsonage and relied on each other for company. The bleak moors surrounding Haworth became their playground. Anne shared a room with her aunt, Elizabeth. They were close, and she may have influenced Anne's personality and religious beliefs.

Education

Anne's studies at home included music and drawing. The Keighley church organist gave piano lessons to Anne and Emily and Branwell, and John Bradley of Keighley gave them art lessons. Each drew with some skill. Their aunt tried to teach the girls how to run a household, but they inclined more to literature. They read much from their father's well-stocked library. Their reading included the Bible, Homer, Virgil, Shakespeare, Milton, Byron, Scott, articles from Blackwood's Edinburgh Magazine and Fraser's Magazine and The Edinburgh Review, and miscellaneous books of history and geography and biography.

Their reading fed their imaginations, and their creativity soared after their father gave Branwell a set of toy soldiers in June 1826. They gave names to the soldiers, or the "Twelves", and developed their characters. This led to the creation of an imaginary world: the African kingdom of "Angria", which was illustrated with maps and watercolour renderings. The children devised plots about the inhabitants of Angria and its capital city, "Glass Town", later called Verreopolis or Verdopolis.

Their fantastical worlds and kingdoms gradually acquired characteristics from their historical world, drawing from its sovereigns, armies, heroes, outlaws, fugitives, inns, schools, and publishers. The characters and lands created by the children were given newspapers and magazines and chronicles written in tiny books with writing so small that it was difficult to read without a magnifying glass. These creations and writings were an apprenticeship for their later literary talents.

Juvenilia
Around 1831, when Anne was eleven, she and Emily broke away from Charlotte and Branwell to create and develop their own fantasy world, "Gondal". Anne and Emily were particularly close, especially after Charlotte left for Roe Head School in January 1831. Charlotte's friend Ellen Nussey visited Haworth in 1833 and reported that Emily and Anne were "like twins" and "inseparable companions". She described Anne so:

Anne took lessons from Charlotte after Charlotte had returned from Roe Head. Charlotte returned to Roe Head as a teacher on 29 July 1835, accompanied by Emily as a pupil. Emily's tuition was largely financed by Charlotte's teaching. Emily was unable to adapt to life at school and was physically ill from homesickness within a few months. She was withdrawn from school by October and replaced by Anne.

Anne was 15 and it was her first time away from home. She made few friends at Roe Head. She was quiet and hardworking and determined to stay to acquire the education which she would need to support herself. She stayed for two years and returned home only during Christmas and summer holidays. She won a good-conduct medal in December 1836. Charlotte's letters almost never mention Anne while Anne was at Roe Head, which might imply that they were not close, but Charlotte was at least concerned about Anne's health. By December 1837 Anne had become seriously ill with gastritis and embroiled in religious crisis. A Moravian minister was called to see her several times during her illness, suggesting her distress was caused, in part, by conflict with the local Anglican clergy. Charlotte wrote to their father and he brought Anne home.

Employment at Blake Hall

A year after leaving the school, and aged 19, Anne was seeking a teaching position. She was the daughter of a poor clergyman and needed to earn money. Her father had no private income and the parsonage would revert to the church on his death. Teaching or working as a governess were among few options for a poor and educated woman. In April 1839 Anne started work as a governess for the Ingham family at Blake Hall, near Mirfield.

The children in her charge were spoiled and disobedient. Anne had great difficulty controlling them and little success in educating them. She was not allowed to punish them, and when she complained about their behaviour she received no support and was criticised for being incapable. The Inghams were dissatisfied with their children's progress and dismissed Anne. She returned home in 1839 at Christmas. At home also were Charlotte and Emily, who had left their positions, and Branwell. Anne's time at Blake Hall was so traumatic that she reproduced it in almost perfect detail in her novel Agnes Grey.

William Weightman
Anne returned to Haworth and met William Weightman (1814–1842), her father's new curate who had started work in the parish in August 1839. Weightman was 25 and had obtained a two-year licentiate in theology from the University of Durham. He was welcome at the parsonage. Anne's acquaintance with him parallels her writing a number of poems, which may suggest she fell in love with him although there is disagreement over this possibility. Little evidence exists beyond a small anecdote of Charlotte's to Ellen Nussey in January 1842.

In Agnes Grey Agnes' interest in the curate refreshes her interest in poetry. Outside fiction William Weightman aroused much curiosity. It seems that he was good-looking and engaging, and that his easy humour and kindness towards the sisters made an impression. It is such a character that she portrays in Edward Weston, and that her heroine Agnes Grey finds deeply appealing.

Weightman died of cholera in the same year. Anne expressed her grief for his death in her poem I will not mourn thee, lovely one, in which she called him "our darling".

Governess

From 1840 to 1845 Anne worked at Thorp Green Hall, a comfortable country house near York. Here she was governess to the children of the Reverend Edmund Robinson and his wife, Lydia. The house appeared as Horton Lodge in Agnes Grey. Anne had four pupils: Lydia (15), Elizabeth (13), Mary (12), and Edmund (8). She initially had problems similar to those at Blake Hall. Anne missed her home and family. In a diary paper in 1841 she wrote that she did not like her situation and wished to leave it. Her quiet and gentle disposition did not help. But Anne was determined and made a success of her position, becoming well-liked by her employers. Her charges, the Robinson girls, became lifelong friends.

Anne spent only five or six weeks a year with her family, during holidays at Christmas and in June. The rest of her time was spent with the Robinsons. She accompanied the Robinsons on annual holidays to Scarborough. Between 1840 and 1844 Anne spent around five weeks each summer at the coastal town and loved it. A number of locations in Scarborough were used for her novels. She had opportunities to collect semi-precious stones, considering an interest in geology, at least  in her novels, or from personal experience, as something suitable for men and women to be considered as equals.

Anne and her sisters considered setting up a school while she was still working for the Robinsons. Various locations were considered, including the parsonage, but the project never materialised. Anne came home on the death of her aunt in early November 1842 while her sisters were in Brussels. Elizabeth Branwell left a £350 legacy (equivalent to £ in ) for each of her nieces.

It was at the Long Plantation at Thorp Green in 1842 that Anne wrote her three-verse poem Lines Composed in a Wood on a Windy Day, which was published in 1846 under the name Acton Bell.

In January 1843 Anne returned to Thorp Green and secured a position for Branwell. He was to tutor Edmund, who was growing too old to be in Anne's care. Branwell did not live in the house as Anne did. Anne's vaunted calm appears to have been the result of hard-fought battles, balancing deeply felt emotions with careful thought, a sense of responsibility and resolute determination. All three Brontë sisters worked as governesses or teachers, and all experienced problems controlling their charges, gaining support from their employers, and coping with homesickness, but Anne was the only one who persevered and made a success of her work.

Back at the parsonage

Anne and Branwell taught at Thorp Green for the next three years. Branwell entered into a secret relationship with his employer's wife, Lydia Robinson. When Anne and Branwell returned home for the holidays in June 1846 Anne resigned. Anne gave no reason, but the reason may have been the relationship between her brother and Mrs Robinson. Branwell was dismissed when his employer found out about the relationship. Anne continued to exchange letters with Elizabeth and Mary Robinson. They came to visit Anne in December 1848.

Anne took Emily to visit some of the places which Anne had become fond of. A plan to visit Scarborough fell through, but they went to York and saw York Minster.

A book of poems

The Brontës were at home with their father during the summer of 1845. None had any immediate prospect of employment. Charlotte found Emily's poems, which had been shared only with Anne. Charlotte said that they should be published. Anne showed her own poems to Charlotte, and Charlotte "thought that these verses too had a sweet sincere pathos of their own". The sisters eventually reached an agreement. They told nobody what they were doing. With the money from Elizabeth Branwell they paid for publication of a collection of poems, 21 from Anne and 21 from Emily and 19 from Charlotte.

The book was published under pen names which retained their initials but concealed their sex. Anne's pseudonym was Acton Bell. Poems by Currer, Ellis, and Acton Bell was available for sale in May 1846. The cost of publication was 31 pounds and 10 shillings, about three-quarters of Anne's salary at Thorp Green. On 7 May 1846 the first three copies were delivered to Haworth Parsonage. The book achieved three somewhat favourable reviews, but was a commercial failure, with only two copies sold in the first year. Anne nonetheless found a market for her later poetry. The Leeds Intelligencer and Fraser's Magazine published her poem The Narrow Way under her pseudonym in December 1848. Four months earlier, Fraser's Magazine had published her poem The Three Guides.

Novels

Agnes Grey

By July 1846 a package containing the manuscripts of each sister's first novel was making the rounds of London publishers. Charlotte had written The Professor, Emily had written Wuthering Heights, and Anne had written Agnes Grey.

After some rejections Wuthering Heights and Agnes Grey were accepted by the publisher Thomas Cautley Newby. The Professor was rejected. It was not long before Charlotte had completed her second novel, Jane Eyre. Jane Eyre was accepted immediately by Smith, Elder & Co. It was the first published of the sisters' novels, and an immediate and resounding success. Meanwhile, Anne and Emily's novels "lingered in the press". Anne and Emily were obliged to pay fifty pounds to help meet their publishing costs. Their publisher was galvanised by the success of Jane Eyre and published Wuthering Heights and Agnes Grey together in December 1847. They sold well, but Agnes Grey was outshone by Emily's more dramatic Wuthering Heights.

The Tenant of Wildfell Hall

 Anne's second novel, The Tenant of Wildfell Hall, was published in the last week of June 1848.

It is easy to underestimate the extent to which the novel challenged the social and legal structures. In 1913 May Sinclair said that the slamming of Helen Huntingdon's bedroom door against her husband reverberated throughout Victorian England.

In the book Helen has left her husband to protect their son from his influence. She supports herself and her son in hiding by painting. She has violated social conventions and English law. Until the Married Women's Property Act 1870 was passed, a married woman had no legal existence independent from her husband and could not own property nor sue for divorce nor control the custody of her children. Helen's husband had a right to reclaim her and charge her with kidnapping. By subsisting on her own income she was stealing her husband's property since this income was legally his.

Anne stated her intentions in the second edition, published in August 1848. She presented a forceful rebuttal to critics (among them Charlotte) who considered her portrayal of Huntingdon overly graphic and disturbing. Anne "wished to tell the truth". She explained further that

Anne also castigated reviewers who speculated on the sex of authors and the perceived appropriateness of their writing. She was

London visit

In July 1848 Anne and Charlotte went to Charlotte's publisher George Smith in London to dispel the rumour that the "Bell brothers" were one person. Emily refused to go. Anne and Charlotte spent several days with Smith. Many years after Anne's death, he wrote in the Cornhill Magazine his impressions of her:

The increasing popularity of the Bells' works led to renewed interest in Poems by Currer, Ellis, and Acton Bell, originally published by Aylott and Jones. The remaining print run was bought by Smith and Elder, and reissued under new covers in November 1848. It still sold poorly.

Family tragedies
Branwell's persistent drunkenness disguised the decline of his health and he died on 24 September 1848. His sudden death shocked the family. He was 31. The cause was recorded as chronic bronchitismarasmus, but was probably tuberculosis.

The family suffered from coughs and colds during the winter of 1848, and Emily became very ill. She worsened over two months and rejected medical aid until the morning of 19 December. She was very weak and said that "if you will send for a doctor, I will see him now". But Emily died at about two o'clock that afternoon, aged 30.

Emily's death deeply affected Anne. Her grief undermined her physical health. Over Christmas Anne had influenza. Her symptoms intensified and in early January her father sent for a Leeds physician. The doctor diagnosed advanced consumption with little hope of recovery. Anne met the news with characteristic determination and self-control. However, in her letter to Ellen Nussey she expressed her frustrated ambitions:

Unlike Emily, Anne took all the recommended medicines and followed the advice she was given. That same month she wrote her last poem, A dreadful darkness closes in, in which she deals with being terminally ill. Her health fluctuated for months, but she grew thinner and weaker.

Death

Anne seemed somewhat better in February. She decided to visit Scarborough to see if the change of location and the fresh sea air might benefit her. Charlotte was initially against the journey, fearing that it would be too stressful, but changed her mind after the doctor's approval and Anne's assurance that it was her last hope.

On 24 May 1849 Anne set off for Scarborough with Charlotte and Ellen Nussey. They spent a day and night in York en route. Here they escorted Anne in a wheelchair and did some shopping and visited York Minster. It was clear that Anne had little strength left.

On Sunday 27 May Anne asked Charlotte whether it would be easier to return home and die instead of remaining in Scarborough. A doctor was consulted the next day and said that death was close. Anne received the news quietly. She expressed her love and concern for Ellen and Charlotte, and whispered for Charlotte to "take courage". Anne died at about two o'clock in the afternoon on Monday 28 May 1849, aged 29.

Charlotte decided to "lay the flower where it had fallen". So Anne was buried in Scarborough. The funeral was held on 30 May. Patrick Brontë could not have made the  journey if he had wished to. The former schoolmistress at Roe Head, Miss Wooler, was in Scarborough, and she was the only other mourner at Anne's funeral. Anne was buried in St Mary's churchyard, beneath the castle walls and overlooking the bay. Charlotte commissioned a stone to be placed over her grave with the inscription,  When Charlotte visited the grave three years later she discovered multiple errors on the headstone and had it refaced. But this was not free of error. For Anne was 29 when she died, not 28 as written.

In 2011 the Brontë Society installed a new plaque at Anne Brontë's grave. The original gravestone had become illegible at places and could not be restored. It was left undisturbed while the new plaque was laid horizontally, interpreting the fading words of the original and correcting its error. In April 2013 the Brontë Society held a dedication and blessing service at the gravesite to mark the installation of the new plaque.

Reputation
After Anne's death Charlotte addressed issues with the first edition of Agnes Grey for its republication, but she prevented republication of The Tenant of Wildfell Hall. In 1850 Charlotte wrote that  Subsequent critics paid less attention to Anne's work and some dismissed her as "a Brontë without genius".

But since the mid-20th century her life and works have been given better attention. Biographies by Winifred Gérin (1959), Elizabeth Langland (1989) and Edward Chitham (1991), as well as Juliet Barker's group biography, The Brontës (1994; revised edition 2000), and work by critics such as Inga-Stina Ewbank, Marianne Thormählen, Laura C Berry, Jan B Gordon, Mary Summers, and Juliet McMaster has led to acceptance of Anne Brontë as a major literary figure. Sally McDonald of the Brontë Society said in 2013 that in some ways Anne "is now viewed as the most radical of the sisters, writing about tough subjects such as women's need to maintain independence and how alcoholism can tear a family apart." In 2016 Lucy Mangan championed Anne Brontë in the BBC's Being the Brontës, declaring that "her time has come".

Works

See also
List of feminist literature - 1840s

Notes

References
 Alexander, Christine & Smith, Margaret, The Oxford Companion to the Brontës, Oxford University Press, 2006, 
 Barker, Juliet, The Brontës, St. Martin's Pr., 
 Chitham, Edward, A Life of Anne Brontë, Oxford: Blackwell Publishers, 1991, 
 Fraser, Rebeca, The Brontës: Charlotte Brontë and her family, Crown Publishers, 1988, 
 Gérin, Winifred, Anne Brontë, Allen Lane, 1976, 
 Harrison, Ada and Stanford, Derek, Anne Brontë – Her Life and Work, Archon Books, 1970 (first published 1959).

Further reading
 Allott, Miriam, The Brontës: The Critical Heritage, 1984
 Barker, Juliet, The Brontës, 2000 (revised edition)
 Chadwick, Ellis, In the Footsteps of the Brontës, 1982
 Chitham, Edward, A Brontë Family Chronology, 2003
 Chitham, Edward, A Life of Anne Brontë, 1991
 Eagleton, Terry, Myths of Power, 1975
 Ellis, Samantha, Take Courage: Anne Brontë and the Art of Life, 2016
 Gérin, Winifred, Anne Brontë: A Biography, 1959
 Langland, Elizabeth, Anne Brontë: The Other One, 1989
 Miller, Lucasta, The Brontë Myth, 2001
 Scott, P. J. M., Anne Brontë: A New Critical Assessment, 1983
 Summers, Mary, Anne Brontë Educating Parents, 2003
 Wise, T. J. and Symington, J. A. (eds.), The Brontës: Their Lives, Friendships and Correspondences, 1932

External links

Anne Brontë – Her grave in Scarborough
Anne Brontë – The Scarborough Connection , biographical materials and complete poems of Anne Brontë
Anne Brontë – Writer Of Genius, biographical materials on Anne and her family 
Anne Bronte at Northwestern University, information about Anne and Victorian society, critical reception of The Tenant of Wildfell Hall

Anne Brontë's biography and works at A Celebration of Women Writers
 Poems by Anne Brontë at English Poetry
 Website of the Brontë Society and Brontë Parsonage Museum in Haworth
 Anne Brontë papers, circa 1840s-1895, held by the Henry W. and Albert A. Berg Collection of English and American Literature, New York Public Library.

Electronic editions
 Anne Brontë eText Archive
 Music On Christmas Morning – Audio Poem
 
 
 
 

1820 births
1849 deaths
19th-century Christian universalists
19th-century deaths from tuberculosis
19th-century English novelists
19th-century English women writers
19th-century pseudonymous writers
Anglican universalists
Anglican writers
Anne
Burials in North Yorkshire
English Anglicans
English Christian universalists
English governesses
English people of Cornish descent
English people of Irish descent
English women novelists
English women poets
Tuberculosis deaths in England
People from Thornton and Allerton
Pseudonymous women writers
Victorian novelists
Victorian women writers